The Otuho people, also known as the Lotuko or Latuka, are a Nilotic ethnic group whose traditional home is the Eastern Equatoria state of South Sudan. some of their villages are Oronyo, Oudo, Angario, Tirangore, Hiyala, Obira, Abalua, illieu, Ifwotu, Imurok, Iyire, Lofiriha, Offi, Oming, Oguruny, illoli, Murahatiha, Hillieu, chalamini, Burung, Haforiere, Tuhubak, Oriaju, Olianga, Hidonge are some of the Otuho villages. They speak the Otuho language.

Demographics
The Otuho  are bordered by the Lopit in the North, the Bari on the West, the Acholi and the Madi in the South, and the Didinga and the Boya in the East. Their region is characterized by ranges and mountain spurs such as the Imotong mountain, the highest mountain in South Sudan with an altitude of 10,453 ft above sea level. 
The Murle people have recently raided  Otuho, the Lopit, and other tribes in the area, abducting their children.

Subsistence
As agro-pastoralists, they keep large herds of cattle, sheep and goats, and supplement this with hoe-farming, hunting, and fishing. They engage in some subsistence agriculture; their main crops are sorghum, ground nuts, simsim (sesame), and maize in the plains, or telebun, dukhn, sweet potatoes, and tobacco in the hills.

Land is owned by no single person, but in trust by the community. In the mountains, after finding a site, the group decides the boundaries of each person's garden, with certain areas being fallow (for up to 10 years) and others open to cultivation (for up to 4 years).

Religion 
Their primary religion is an ethnic religion based on nature and ancestor worship that is deeply rooted in their ethnic identity; conversion to another religion essentially equates to cultural assimilation. The chief god of the Otuho is called Ajok; he is generally seen as kind and benevolent, but can be angered. In Otuho mythology he once answered a woman's prayer for the resurrection of her son. Her husband, however, was angry and re-killed the child. Ajok was annoyed by his actions and swore never to resurrect any Otuho again, and in this manner, death was said to have become permanent.

References

External links
Lotuka (Otuho) people on Gurtong.net

Ethnic groups in South Sudan